Cano or CANO may refer to:

People
 Alfonso Cano (1948–2011), Chief of the Revolutionary Armed Forces of Colombia
 Alonzo Cano (1601–1667), Spanish painter
 Antonio Cano (1779–1840), sculptor, architect, and lay friar of the Kingdom of Sardinia
 Ciriaco Cano (born 1948), Spanish footballer
 Emilia Cano (born 1968), Spanish race walker
 Fanny Cano (1944–1983), Mexican actress and producer
 Francisco Cano, Conquistador
 Gabriel Cano de Aponte (1665–1733), Lieutenant General
 Germán Cano (born 1988), Argentine footballer
 Joaquín Gutiérrez Cano (1920–2009), Spanish diplomat and politician
 Jennifer Johnson Cano, American mezzo-soprano
 Jesús Arango Cano (1915–2015), Colombian anthropologist, archaeologist and writer
 José Canó (born 1962), Dominican baseball player
 José María Cano (born 1959), Spanish singer and songwriter
 José Ortega Cano (born 1953), Spanish bullfighter
 Joselyn Cano (1990–2020), American Model
 Juan de la Cruz Ramos Cano, former footballer and manager
 Leopoldo Cano (1844–1934), Spanish soldier, poet and playwright
 Malena Cano, ranchera and mariachi singer
 Melchior Cano, Spanish theologian
 Óscar Cano (born 1972), Spanish football manager
 Raúl Tito (born Raúl Alexánder Tito Cano; 1997), Peruvian footballer
 Ricardo Cano (born 1951), Argentine tennis player
 Ricardo Obregón Cano (1917–2016), Argentine Justicialist Party politician
 Robinson Canó (born 1982), Dominican baseball player; son of baseball player José Canó
 Rubén Cano (born 1951), retired Argentine-Spanish footballer
 Sandra Cano, American politician
 Yennier Canó (born 1994), Cuban baseball player

Other
 CANO, a French Canadian progressive rock group
 Cano (planthopper), in family Caliscelidae

See also
 Caño Limón oilfield
 Isla del Caño
 USS El Cano (IX-79)
 Juan Sebastián Elcano (1476–1526), Basque explorer subject of the Crown of Castille, first man to circumnavigate the world

Basque-language surnames